Sonarika Bhadoria is an Indian actress who appears in Hindi television and Telugu films. She is best known for her portrayal of Goddess Parvati / Adi Shakti in the television series Devon Ke Dev...Mahadev.

Early life

Bhadoria is a from a Rajput clan of the Chambal River region. She was born and raised in Mumbai. She attended Yashodham High School and did her graduation from Ruparel College.

Career

Television (2011–present)
Bhadoria made her television debut in 2011 with Life OK's Tum Dena Saath Mera as Abhilasha. She gained a household name with her portrayal of Parvati in Devon Ke Dev...Mahadev.
In 2018, she starred as Mrinal in Sony TV's Prithvi Vallabh and Anarkali in Colors TV's Salim Anarkali. In 2019, she was seen as Netra Sharma in Ishq Mein Marjawan.

Debut in films (2015–present)
In 2015, Bhadoria made her debut in Telugu cinema as Parvathi in Jadoogadu. She was also signed by Bhimaneni Srinivasa Rao in Speedunnodu, the Telugu remake of the 2012 hit romantic drama film Sundarapandian. The film was released in February 2016 to positive reviews and she was praised for her performance. Her second release in 2016 was the successful Telugu film Eedo Rakam Aado Rakam.

She signed to play the lead role in her debut Hindi film Saansein, directed by Rajiv S Ruia, opposite Rajneesh Duggal.

Media
In 2018, Bhadoria was listed in The Times of Indias Top 20 Most Desirable Women on Indian Television.

Filmography

Film

Television

References

External links 
 
 
 
 

Living people
Actresses in Telugu cinema
21st-century Indian actresses
Indian film actresses
Actresses from Mumbai
Indian television actresses
Actresses in Hindi cinema
Actresses in Tamil cinema
Actresses in Hindi television
1992 births
University of Mumbai alumni